Rafsan Al Mahmud is a Bangladeshi cricketer. He made his List A debut for Khelaghar Samaj Kallyan Samity in the 2016–17 Dhaka Premier Division Cricket League on 15 May 2017. He made his first-class debut for Barisal Division in the 2017–18 National Cricket League on 16 September 2017. He made his Twenty20 debut for Khelaghar Samaj Kallyan Samity in the 2018–19 Dhaka Premier Division Twenty20 Cricket League on 25 February 2019.

References

External links
 

Year of birth missing (living people)
Living people
Bangladeshi cricketers
Barisal Division cricketers
Khelaghar Samaj Kallyan Samity cricketers
Place of birth missing (living people)